Vukdrag (d. 1327) was a Serbian nobleman who served King Stefan Dečanski (r. 1321–31) as čelnik. He was a magnate in the Rudnik mountain area, who founded (as the ktetor) the Raška style church in Dići (near Ljig, central Serbia), below the Rudnik, before 1327, most likely as a family temple. He must have had one of the important gubernatorial functions in the Rudnik oblast (province) during the reigns of kings Stefan Milutin (r. 1282–1321) and Stefan Dečanski. Unknown in historical sources, he was buried in his church, where his gravestone inscription tells that he died on 8 May 1327, on the Feast of the Ascension (Spasovdan), and that he had taken monastic vows as Nikola (Никола) and [once] held the title of čelnik. It is unclear if there was one or several individuals with that title at the court at that time; Đuraš Ilijić ( 1326–62) was mentioned with the title in 1326, and Gradislav Vojšić (fl. 1284–1327), for the second time, in 1327. He was buried in a special tomb inside the church, and his gravestone was set by his wife Vladislava (nun Ana). The unearthing of the gravestone gave new facts in the understanding of the territorial contours of the Serbian state north of Rudnik at the end of the 13th- and beginning of 14th century. The largest medieval necropolis in Serbia was unearthed around the church, with flat gravestones (more than 180 slabs) belonging to the oldest phase of the Stećak culture.


Annotations

References

Sources

External links

14th-century Serbian nobility
14th-century Serbian judges
Medieval Serbian magnates
People of the Kingdom of Serbia (medieval)
1327 deaths
Ktetors
Kolubara District